Qaderabad (also Romanized as Qāderābād; also known as Ghader Abad Mehraban and Qādīrābād) is a village in Shirin Su Rural District, Shirin Su District, Kabudarahang County, Hamadan Province, Iran. At the 2006 census, its population was 519, in 107 families.

References 

Populated places in Kabudarahang County